Christopher Mastomäki (born December 8, 1996) is a Swedish professional ice hockey player. He is currently playing with Örebro HK of the Swedish Hockey League (SHL).

Mastomäki made his Swedish Hockey League debut playing with Luleå HF during the 2015–16 SHL season.

References

External links

1996 births
Living people
Luleå HF players
Örebro HK players
Swedish ice hockey centres
VIK Västerås HK players